R. A. Headworks or Ramaswamy Aiyar Headworks is a masonry type weir situated in Munnar panchayath of Munnar village in Idukki district of Kerala,  India impounding mudirapuzha river. It is also called as Munnar Headworks. It is a part of Pallivasal Hydro Electric Project, the first hydro power project of Kerala State. There are two dams and one diversion weir as part of this project. These are Kundala Dam, Maduppetty Dam and R. A. Head works.

The water stored in the Kundala reservoir is released through the stream to Maduppetty Dam located downstream. From the Maduppetty reservoir the water is released to downstream through a dam toe power house. The controlled release from Maduppetty Dam reaches the diversion weir named R.A. Head works  and from there, the water is diverted through a water conducting system to the power house of Pallivasal HEP located on the right bank of Mudirapuzha river. After generating power, the tail water is pumped to the balancing reservoir of Sengulam Hydro Electric Project and the surplus water from the sump of pumping station is spilled to the Mudirapuzha river itself.

Specifications 

Latitude : 10⁰ 04’00” N N
Longitude: 77⁰ 04′ 00″ E
Panchayath : Munnar
Village : Munnar
District : Idukki
River Basin : Muthirapuzha
River:Muthirapuzha
Release from Dam to river : Muthirapuzha
 Dam type  : Masonry
Classification : Weir
Maximum Water Level (MWL) : EL 1450.92 m
Full Reservoir Level ( FRL) : EL 1450.92 m
Storage at FRL : 0.223 Mm3
Height from deepest foundation : 10.90 m
Length : 39.62 m
Taluk through which release flows : Devikulam
Spillway : Vertical gate, 3 Nos. of size 11.60 x 6.70 m each
Year of completion : 1944 
Crest LevelEL : 1439.02 m
Name of Project: Pallivasal HEP
River Outlet : Not provided
Purpose of Project: Hydro Power

References

Dams in Kerala
Dams in Idukki district